This is a list of Cypriot football transfers for the 2008–09 winter transfer window by club. Only transfers of the Cypriot First Division are included.

The winter transfer window opened on 1 January 2009, although a few transfers took place prior to that date. The window closed at midnight on 1  February 2009. Players without a club may join one at any time, either during or in between transfer windows.

Player Transfers

AEK Larnaca

In:

 
  
 
 
 
 
 

Out:

AEL Limassol

In:

Out:

AEP Paphos

In:

Out:

Alki Larnaca

In:

 
 

Out:

Anorthosis FC

In:

Out:

APEP Pitsilia

In:

Out:

Apoel

In:

Out:

Apollon Limassol

In:

Out:

APOP Kinyras Peyias

In:

Out:

Atromitos Yeroskipou

In:

Out:

Doxa Katokopia

In:

Out:

Enosis Neon Paralimni

In:

Out:

Ethnikos Achna

In:

Out:

Omonia

In:

Out:

References

See also
 List of Belgian football transfers winter 2008–09
 List of Danish football transfers winter 2008-09
 List of Dutch football transfers winter 2008-09
 List of English football transfers winter 2008-09
 List of German football transfers winter 2008–09
 List of Italian football transfers winter 2008–09 
 List of Maltese football transfers winter 2008-09
 List of Spanish football transfers winter 2008-09

Transfers Winter 2008-09
2008-09
Cypriot